The 12867 / 68 Howrah–Puducherry  Superfast Express is a Superfast Express train belonging to Indian Railways South Eastern Railway zone that runs between  and  in India.

It operates as train number 12867 from Howrah Junction to Puducherry and as train number 12868 in the reverse direction, serving the states of West Bengal, Odisha, Andhra Pradesh & Tamil Nadu.

Coaches
The 12867 / 68 Howrah–Puducherry  Express has one AC 2-tier, six AC 3-tier, 11 sleeper class, two general unreserved & two SLR (seating with luggage rake) coaches. It carries a pantry car.

As is customary with most train services in India, coach composition may be amended at the discretion of Indian Railways depending on demand.

Service

As the average speed of the train is above , as per railway rules, its fare includes a Superfast surcharge.

Routing

Traction

Schedule

12867 leaves Howrah every Sunday at night 11:30 PM IST and reaches Puducherry (Pondicherry) 
Tuesday at morning 8:50 AM

12868 leaves Puducherry (Pondicherry) every Wednesday at afternoon 12:30 PM IST and reaches Howrah on Thursday at 10:22 PM IST

Reverse

The train is reversed at Visakhapatnam railway station.

References

External links
12867 Howrah Puducherry Express at India Rail Info
12868 Puducherry Howrah Express at India Rail Info

Express trains in India
Rail transport in Howrah
Rail transport in West Bengal
Rail transport in Odisha
Rail transport in Andhra Pradesh
Rail transport in Tamil Nadu
Transport in Puducherry